Roslyn was a railway station on the Crookwell railway line, New South Wales, Australia. The station opened in 1902 with the opening of the line, and consisted of a 100 ft platform on the down side of the line with a loop siding on the up side. Cattle loading facilities and goods sheds were also provided.  It was named after the estate of a local resident Dr Mitchell. In 1925, the station became the location of the branch line to Taralga, with the new branch extending off the loop line.. The platform was shortened to 30 ft in 1969, and closed in 1974 with the cessation of passenger services. in 1975 the station and goods facilities were demolished. The line through Roslyn closed to goods traffic in 1984, and little remains at the site apart from the mainline track, the goods loading bank and the station master's residence.

References

Buildings and structures demolished in 1975
Disused regional railway stations in New South Wales
Railway stations in Australia opened in 1902
Railway stations closed in 1974